Steve Nave (died June 6, 2015) was an American actor and casting director. He appeared in over 50 feature films and 60 television shows. He played professional minor league baseball until age 22 when he started acting. In 1993 he founded Steve Nave Actor Showcase where he brought actors in for a performance workshop where actors network and perform for some of the top producers, casting directors, and directors in the industry. He died from cancer on June 6, 2015.

External links
Steve Nave Fayr Barkley Media
Steve Nave Actor Showcase

References

Year of birth missing
2015 deaths
American male television actors
Place of death missing
20th-century American male actors
Place of birth missing
20th-century births